Hobart High School is located in Hobart, Indiana. It is part of the School City of Hobart district. U.S. News & World Report ranked it 163rd within Indiana, and 7,137 in National Rankings. Their ranking was based upon performance on state-required tests, graduation and college preparation. Their college Advanced Placement participation rate is 31%.

History
The graduating class of 2009 was the first class to graduate from the school's new building at 2211 East 10th Street. The old high school, located at 36 East 8th Street, became the middle school. That building was built in the late 1950s. Prior to that, the high school students attended Roosevelt School, most recently part of the old junior high school on 4th Street.

Demographics
The demographic breakdown of the 1,323 students enrolled for the 2015-2016 school year was as follows:

Male - 49.5%
Female - 50.5%
Native American - 0.5%
Asian/Pacific islander - 0.6%
Black - 7.5%
Hispanic - 22.8%
White - 65.8%
Multiracial - 2.8%

40.7% of the students were eligible for free or reduced-cost lunch. For 2019-2020, Hobart was a Title I school.

Athletics
The sports teams at Hobart High School are known as the "Brickies", a name derived from the brick yards that were historically located in Hobart and employed many people in the area. The school mascot is a bricklayer named Yohan. Uniform colors are Purple and Gold. Sports offered include:

Baseball (boys)
Basketball (girls)
Cross Country (boys and girls)
Boys state champs - 1957, 1960.
Football (boys)
State champs - 1987, 1989, 1991, 1993.
Golf (boys and girls)
Gymnastics (girls)
State champs - 2004.
Soccer (boys and girls)
Softball (girls)
Swimming (boys and girls)
Tennis (boys and girls)
Track (boys and girls)
Volleyball (girls)
Wrestling (boys)

Notable alumni
 Omar Apollo - R&B musician
 Larry Bigbie - Former MLB player for the Baltimore Orioles, Colorado Rockies and St. Louis Cardinals
 Bob Kuechenberg - Former NFL All-Pro lineman for the Miami Dolphins
 Rudy Kuechenberg - Former NFL linebacker for the Chicago Bears, Cleveland Browns, Green Bay Packers and Atlanta Falcons
 Dale Messick - Commercial artist and creator of Brenda Starr
 Craig Osika - Former NFL player
 Gary Primich - Blues musician

See also
 List of high schools in Indiana

References

External links

Public high schools in Indiana
Schools in Lake County, Indiana
1950s establishments in Indiana